John Edward Davis (1815-1877) was a Royal Navy officer, hydrographic surveyor and artist, noted for his illustrations of the Antarctic voyage of James Clark Ross (1839-1843) and for his expertise in deep-sea sounding.

Davis was born in 1815 and entered the Navy in July 1828. He spent a period with HMS Beagle surveying parts of the coasts of Chile, Peru and Bolivia.

In August 1839 Davis was appointed second master on  under Captain Francis Crozier. The expedition discovered the Transantarctic Mountains and the volcanoes Erebus and Terror, named after the ships. Davis was responsible for surveying operations and preparing charts, and also made numerous illustrations of events on the voyage. On returning to England Davis was thanked by Francis Beaufort, Hydrographer and promoted to master 

From 1844 until 1862 Davis worked as a surveyor in home waters, first as assistant-surveyor to Captain G.A. Bedford on the west coast of Ireland, then on the south coast of England with Lieutenant H.L. Cox and then with Staff-Commander Usborne. This was successful in finding a suitable route for a transatlantic cable, avoiding the precipitous slopes that mark much of the edge of the continental shelf. Davis was commended in official reports for his contributions to this work. He then became a naval assistant to the Admiralty, responsible for supervision of deep-sea sounding equipment and for maintaining the catalogue of official documents. He published a number of works on the technical aspects of surveying and exploration, in particular on deep-sea temperature measurement. He was promoted Staff-Commander in 1863, and to Captain in 1870. He retired from the Hydrographic Office in 1877 and died later that year.

Bibliography

References

External links

 Paintings by Davis in the collection of the Scott Polar Research Institute

Royal Navy officers
1815 births
1877 deaths